Arise: From Ginnungagap to Ragnarök – The History of the Vikings Volume III is a concept album by German heavy metal band Rebellion and the last part of the Viking History trilogy. This album tells the history of the Norse Gods and Norse religion.

Track listing 
All songs written by Michael Seifert, Uwe Lulis and Tomi Gottlich. 
"War" – 3:53
"Arise" – 4:39
"Asgard" – 3:19
"Odin" – 4:39
"Runes" – 5:14
"Bolverk" – 3:16
"Thor" – 9:07
"Evil" – 4:10
"Loki" – 4:10
"Prelude" – 3:42
"Ragnarök" – 5:48
"Einherjar" – 7:22

Lyrical concept 

 "War" is about the war before the world was created, when Odin exterminated many giants.
 "Evil" is about Hel, Loki, Angrboda and Fenris: the evil characters of Norse Mythology.
 "Prelude" is about the time right before Ragnarök, when Jörmungandr comes and the world begins to crumble.

Personnel

Rebellion
Michael Seifert: vocals
Uwe Lulis: rhythm and lead guitar
Simone Wenzel: rhythm and lead Guitar
Tomi Göttlich: bass
Gerd Lücking: drums, percussion

Additional personnel
Malte Rathke: keyboards; orchestral arrangement on track 7

References 

Rebellion (band) albums
2009 albums
Concept albums
Massacre Records albums
Sequel albums